Eupithecia fosteri is a moth in the family Geometridae.

References

Moths described in 1983
fosteri